William Spence was an English professional footballer who played as a centre forward.

Career
Spence moved from Throckley Welfare to Bradford City in May 1927. He made 2 league appearances for the club, scoring once, before signing for West Stanley in December 1928.

Sources

References

Date of birth missing
Date of death missing
English footballers
Throckley Welfare F.C. players
Bradford City A.F.C. players
West Stanley F.C. players
English Football League players
Association football forwards